Charles Williams (1912 – after 1933) was an English professional footballer who played in the Football League for Mansfield Town.

References

1912 births
Date of death unknown
English footballers
Association football goalkeepers
English Football League players
Shirebrook Miners Welfare F.C. players
Mansfield Town F.C. players
Rhyl F.C. players